Arcand is a surname. Notable people with the surname include:

 Adrien Arcand (1899–1967), Canadian far-right politician
 Denys Arcand (b. 1941), Canadian film director, producer and screenwriter
 Gabriel Arcand (b. 1949), Canadian actor, brother of Denys Arcand
 Jean-Louis Arcand, Canadian economist
 Jean-Olivier Arcand (1793–1875), Canadian political figure
 Nelly Arcan (1973–2009), Canadian novelist
 Paul Arcand (b. 1960), Canadian journalist, radio host and film producer
 Pierre Arcand (b. 1951), Canadian businessman and politician, brother of Paul Arcand
 Théodore Jean Arcand (b. 1934), Canadian diplomat